The Qiao Family Compound, originally the Zaizhong Hall and officially  is a courtyard house located in Qi County, Jinzhong Prefecture, Shanxi Province, China, approximately  northeast of Pingyao. It is the residential compound of well-known financier Qiao Zhiyong (乔致庸/喬致庸, 1818—1907), who was the most famous member of the Qiao family. Construction began in 1756 during the reign of the Qianlong Emperor in the Qing dynasty and was completed sometime in the 18th century. The estate covers 9000 square meters and has 313 rooms with 4000 square meters within 6 large courtyards and 19 smaller courtyards. 

Architects consider it to be one of the finest remaining examples of imposing private residences in northern China. It has been converted into a museum and has many period furnishings.

It is famous for being the chief location in the Zhang Yimou film Raise the Red Lantern. A 2006 Chinese television series, Qiao's Grand Courtyard, was also shot here.

See also
 Siheyuan
 Shanxi courtyard houses

References

External links

Travel China on Qiao's compound

Major National Historical and Cultural Sites in Shanxi
Traditional folk houses in China
Houses completed in the 18th century
Jinzhong